This is a list of Japanese football transfers in the winter transfer window 2015–16 by club.

J1 League

J2 League

J3 League 

2015–16
Transfers
Japan